It'z Just What We Do is the second EP by American country music duo Florida Georgia Line. It was released in May 2012, by Big Loud Mountain. All five songs from the extended play later appeared on their debut studio album, Here's to the Good Times (2012).

Critical reception
Jessica Nicholson of Country Weekly gave the album a very positive review, saying that "Newcomers Brian Kelley and Tyler Hubbard of Florida Georgia Line first met while students at Nashville’s Belmont University, and melded their diverse musical backgrounds to create their first five-song EP. No softhearted love songs here, though. Producer Joey Moi (Jake Owen, Nickelback) is a fine match for the duo’s country-meets-alt-rock sound."

Commercial performance
The album peaked at number 18 on the Top Country Albums chart. Additionally, it peaked on number 105 on the US Billboard 200, on number 45 on the Independent Albums chart, and reached number one on the Top Heatseekers chart.

Track listing

Charts and certifications

Weekly charts

References

2012 EPs
Florida Georgia Line EPs
Albums produced by Joey Moi
Big Loud albums